Under-soil heating is a method used in various sports stadia (with a grass surface) which heats the underside of the pitch to avoid any elements from bad weather, such as snow and ice, from building up and ultimately helps the club avoid having to postpone any matches.

Most English Premier League teams now have this installed in their stadiums. While it is not an official requirement, it avoids any financial loss that a club might face in having to postpone any matches due to bad weather. The first ground in England to have under-soil heating installed was Goodison Park in 1958. The pitch at Old Trafford has  of under-soil heating and at Elland Road there is an under-soil heating system installed beneath the surface, consisting of 59 miles (95 km) of piping.

In Germany under-soil heating is mandatory for division 1 and 2 Bundesliga clubs. The first ground to have it installed was the Olympic Stadium of Munich in 1972.

In the Czech Republic, despite the league having a winter break, the Czech First League requires all participating teams to play on surfaces with under-soil heating.

Several American football teams in the National Football League also have such a system installed. With American football, it is more a matter of player safety, since NFL games are never postponed on account of cold weather.

There have been numerous occasions where under-soil heating's effectiveness has been questioned. One notable incident happened on December 27, 2005 when three stadia in the FA Premier League, supposedly equipped with under-soil heating, failed to stop their pitches being covered in thick snow - this led to the matches being postponed. Subsequently, on January 1, 2006, the Premier League investigated as to why the pitches at Reebok Stadium (Bolton Wanderers), Ewood Park (Blackburn Rovers) and St. James' Park (Newcastle United) were not able to repel the snow. In the U.S., a notable example of the failure of an under-soil heating system occurred in 1967, when a newly installed system at Lambeau Field in Green Bay, Wisconsin failed before the NFL Championship game. The game would go on to be remembered as the "Ice Bowl".

References

External links

Association football terminology